Blind Date, also known as Deadly Seduction, is a 1984 independent erotic thriller film directed by B-film maker Nico Mastorakis. It stars Kirstie Alley, Joseph Bottoms, Marina Sirtis, Valeria Golino, and Lana Clarkson.

Premise
When Jonathan Ratcliff (Joseph Bottoms) suddenly becomes blind, doctors fit him with an experimental electronic device designed to partially restore his sight.  With his renewed vision, he witnesses a murder and must stop a serial killer.

References

External links

1984 films
American independent films
Films shot in Athens
1984 horror films
1980s horror thriller films
American detective films
Films about blind people
American horror thriller films
Films scored by Stanley Myers
1980s English-language films
Films directed by Nico Mastorakis
1980s American films